Nohar Assembly constituency is one of constituencies of Rajasthan Legislative Assembly in the Churu (Lok Sabha constituency).

Nohar Constituency covers all voters from parts of Nohar tehsil, which includes ILRC Nohar (including Nohar Municipal Council, ILRC Deidas, ILRC Gorkhana, ILRC Phephana, ILRC Meghana and ILRC Jabrasar; and parts of Rawatsar tehsil, which includes ILRC Baramsar and ILRC Pallu.

List of MLAs

See also
 Member of the Legislative Assembly (India)

References

Hanumangarh district
Assembly constituencies of Rajasthan